Gradišče pri Litiji is a village east of Litija in central Slovenia. It belongs to the Municipality of Šmartno pri Litiji. The area is part of the historical region of Lower Carniola. The municipality is now included in the Central Slovenia Statistical Region.

Name
The name of the settlement was changed from Gradišče to Gradišče pri Litiji in 1953.

Church
The local church is dedicated to Mary Magdalene and belongs to the Parish of Šmartno. The original 18th-century church was demolished in 1945. The new church, built according to plans by the architect Jože Plečnik, was consecrated in 1979.

References

External links

Gradišče pri Litiji at Geopedia

Populated places in the Municipality of Šmartno pri Litiji